= Regionalist Social Party (Institutional Union) =

Political party in Spain

Regionalist Social Party (Institutional Union) Partido Social Regionalista (Unión Institucional
- Founded: 1976
- Headquarters: Catalonia (1970s)
- Ideology: Carlist

Regionalist Social Party (Institutional Union) (in Spanish: Partido Social Regionalista (Unión Institucional)), a political party in Spain. PSR was founded in 1976, and was one of the first five political parties registered on 4 October 1976. PSR was of Carlist inspiration. At the time of its foundation the party was based in Catalonia.

The party is reported to remain in existence, but little is known about it. It called for a vote for Partido Popularin the 1996 elections.
